Salman Schocken or Shlomo Zalman Schocken (October 30, 1877 August 6, 1959) was a German Jewish publisher, and co-founder of the large Kaufhaus Schocken chain of department stores in Germany. Stripped of his citizenship and forced to sell his company by the German government, he immigrated to Mandatory Palestine in 1934, where he purchased the newspaper Haaretz (which is still majority-owned by his descendants).

Biography

Germany
Salman Schocken ("S" in Salman pronounced "Z") was born on October 30, 1877, in Margonin, Posen, German Empire (today Poland), the son of a Jewish shopkeeper. In 1901, he moved to Zwickau, a German town in southwest Saxony, to help manage a department store owned by his brother, Simon. Together they built up the business and established a chain of Kaufhaus Schocken stores throughout Germany. Schocken commissioned German Jewish architect Erich Mendelsohn to design Modernist style buildings.  He opened branches in Nuremberg (1926), Stuttgart (1928) and Chemnitz (1930, the only one to survive). By 1930 the Schocken chain was one of the largest in Europe, with 20 stores. After his brother Simon's death in 1929, when his friend Franz Rosenzweig also died, Salman Schocken became sole owner of the chain.

In 1915, Schocken co-founded the Zionist journal Der Jude (with Martin Buber). Schocken would support Buber financially, as well as other Jewish writers such as Gerschom Scholem and S.Y. Agnon. In 1930 he established the Schocken Institute for Research on Hebrew Poetry in Berlin, a research center intended to discover and publish manuscripts of medieval Jewish poetry. The inspiration for this project was his longstanding dream of finding a Jewish equivalent for the foundational literature of Germany, such as the German epic poem The Nibelungenlied. In 1931, he founded the publishing company Schocken Verlag, which printed books by German Jewish writers such as Franz Kafka and Walter Benjamin, making their work widely available; they also reprinted the Buber-Rosenzweig translation of the Bible. These initiatives earned him the nickname "the mystical merchant" from his friend Scholem.

In 1933, the Nazis stripped Schocken of his German citizenship. They forced him to sell his German enterprises to Merkur AG, but he managed to recover some of his property after World War II.

Palestine
In 1934 Schocken left Germany for Palestine. In Jerusalem, he built the Schocken Library, also designed by Erich Mendelsohn. He became  a board member of the Hebrew University of Jerusalem, and bought the newspaper Haaretz for 23,000 pounds sterling in 1935. His eldest son, Gershom Schocken, became the chief editor in 1939 and held that position until his death in 1990. The Schocken family today has a 60% share of the newspaper. Salman Schocken also founded the Schocken Publishing House Ltd. and, in New York in 1945 with the aid of Hannah Arendt and Nahum Glatzer, opened another branch, Schocken Books. In 1987 Schocken Books became an imprint of the Knopf Doubleday Publishing Group at Random House, owned by widely diversified media corporation Bertelsmann since 1998.

Schocken became a board member of the Jewish National Fund and helped with the purchase of land in the Haifa Bay area.

Schocken became the patron of Shmuel Yosef Agnon during his years in Germany. Recognizing Agnon's literary talent, Schocken paid him a stipend that relieved him of financial worries and allowed him to devote himself to writing. Agnon went on to win the Nobel Prize in Literature in 1966.

United States
In 1940 Schocken left Palestine with his family except for one son (Gershom), and settled in the United States, where he founded Schocken Books.
 
Schocken died of heart failure on August 6, 1959, while vacationing at an Alpine resort in Pontresina, Switzerland. He was buried in Israel.

Family
In 1910 Salman Schocken married Zerline (Lilli) Ehrmann, a twenty-year-old German Jewish woman from Frankfurt. They had four sons and one daughter. Their eldest son, Gustav Gershom Schocken, succeeded his father at the Schocken publishing house in Tel Aviv and at the Haaretz newspaper. Another son, Gideon Schocken, became a Haganah fighter and later a general and the head of the Manpower Directorate of the Israel Defense Forces.

Schocken house in Jerusalem
The home of Salman Schocken is at 7 Smolenskin Street in the Rehavia neighborhood of Jerusalem. It was designed by Erich Mendelsohn. The building, constructed of Jerusalem stone between 1934 and 1936, was originally surrounded by a spacious  garden. In 1957, the property was sold to the Jerusalem Academy of Music and Dance, which invited another architect, Joseph Klarvin, to design an additional front wing of classrooms facing the street. Klarvin also added a third story, dispensing with the pergolas and blocking over the oval pool in the courtyard. 

Schocken also had a library built in Jerusalem for his significant book collection. The building was also designed by Erich Mendelsohn and was built at 6 Balfour Street, a few buildings over from the home. Today, the historic building is home to the Schocken Institute for Jewish Research of the Jewish Theological Seminary of America. The Institute houses the Salman Schocken Library and other important archives and collections of Jewish and other books.

Reparations
On June 12, 2014, a court in Berlin awarded 50 million euros to Salman Schocken's surviving heirs in Israel as part of reparations for the seizure of Schocken AG by the Nazi regime in 1938.

See also
 List of German Jews

References

Further reading
Anthony David, The Patron: A Life of S. Schocken, 1877–1959, New York: Metropolitan Books, 2003. The book is well-written but contains numerous factual errors (see Fresh Vegetables, Goethe and Rabbi Nachman [The Don Quixote of the Jet Age]).

External links 
 Objekte - Erich Mendelsohn: Brief an seine Frau Luise vom 3. Februar 1933

1877 births
1959 deaths
People from Margonin
People from the Province of Posen
Jewish emigrants from Nazi Germany to Mandatory Palestine
American publishers (people)
German publishers (people)
Jewish printing and publishing
Israeli publishers (people)